This is a list of universities in Sint Maarten.

Universities 

 American University of the Caribbean 
 American University of Integrative Sciences 
 University of St. Martin

See also 
 List of universities by country

 
Universities
Sint Maarten
Sint Maarten

Universities